Aksel Christian Henrik Hansen (2 September 1853 – 3 May 1933) was a Danish sculptor, one of the most productive of his times.

Biography
The son of a stonemason, Hansen was born in Odense, Denmark. After an apprenticeship with his father, he studied architecture at the Royal Danish Academy of Fine Arts (1876-1879). He exhibited at the Charlottenborg Spring Exhibition from 1880. He received the Hielmstierne-Rosencrone and the Ancker scholarships in 1888. He conducted study trips to Italy 1888-89 and to Greece 1904.

While following the classical tradition of Herman Wilhelm Bissen, he was also influenced by French Naturalism and the Art Nouveau style. This emerging trend can be seen in his masterpiece, Echo (1888), in Copenhagen's Rosenborg Castle Gardens, as well as in Gustav Lotze's tomb with its slender female figures in Odense's Assistens Cemetery. His statue of Uffe den Spage (1904), outside the Østerbro Stadium, shows how the Nordic character is reflected in ancient legends. Among his best known works are the six giants in the guardroom at Christiansborg Palace (1912) and the equestrian statue of King Christian IX (1912) in Odense's Royal Gardens.

List of works
Echo, Rosenborg Castle Gardens, Copenhagen (1888)
 Hans Tausen Monument, Birkende, Funen (1894)
 Christian IV, Odense Palace, Odense
 Ancient hunter, Dalgas Boulevard, Frederiksberg, Copenhagen
 Ambrosius, Frederick's Church, Copenhagen

Image gallery

References

1853 births
1933 deaths
People from Odense
20th-century Danish sculptors
Male sculptors
19th-century sculptors
Danish male artists
20th-century Danish male artists